Swimming at the 2019 African Games was held from 21 to 24 August 2019 in Casablanca, Morocco.

The event served as a qualifier for the 2020 Summer Olympics in Tokyo, Japan.

Schedule

Participating nations

Medal table

Medal summary

Men's events

Women's events

Mixed events 

 Swimmers who participated in the heats only and received medals.

References

External links
 Swimming at the 2019 African Games
 Results book
 Results

 
2019 African Games
African Games
2019 African Games
2019